Henry Clarke (c. 1917 – April 26, 1996) was an American fashion photographer, known particularly for his work for Vogue.

Clarke was born in Los Angeles in about 1917. He died on April 26, 1996, at the Anglo-American Hospital in Le Cannet, France, at the age of 78.

References

1910s births
1996 deaths
20th-century American photographers
Fashion photographers